The 2017 Pakistan Cup was the second edition of the Pakistan Cup, a List A cricket competition. It was held from 16 to 29 April 2017, with all the matches played at the Rawalpindi Cricket Stadium, Rawalpindi. It was contested between five teams, with the squads for the tournament announced on 21 March 2017. Federal Areas won the tournament, beating Balochistan by one wicket in the final.

Squads

Prior to the start of the tournament, the following squads were announced:

Group stage

Points table

 Teams qualified for the final

Fixtures

Final

References

External links
 Series home at ESPN Cricino

2017 in Pakistani cricket
2017 in Punjab, Pakistan
21st century in Rawalpindi
April 2017 sports events in Pakistan
Cricket in Rawalpindi
2017